November 6 - Eastern Orthodox liturgical calendar - November 8

All fixed commemorations below celebrated on November 20 by Orthodox Churches on the Old Calendar.

For November 7th, Orthodox Churches on the Old Calendar commemorate the Saints listed on October 25.

Saints
 Holy 33 Martyrs of Melitene (290):
 Hieron, Hesychius, Nicander, Athanasius, Mamas, Barachius, Callinicus, Theogenes, Nicon, Longinus, Theodore, Valerius, Xanthius, Theodulus, Callimachus, Eugene, Theodochus, Ostrychius, Epiphanius, Maximian, Ducitius, Claudian, Theophilus, Gigantius, Dorotheus, Theodotus, Castrychius, Anicetus, Theomelius, Eutychius, Hilarion, Diodotus, and Amonitus. 
 Martyrs Matronian and Anthony, brothers of martyr Hieron, at Melitene (290)
 Saint Gregory, brother of St. Gregory the Wonderworker (3rd century)
 Martyrs Auctus, Taurion, and Thessaloniki, at Amphipolis in Macedonia.
 Martyr Theodotus of Ancyra (303)  (see also: May 18)
 Martyr Alexander of Thessalonica (c. 305)
 Martyrs Melasippus, Cassina, their son Antoninus, and 40 children converted by their martyrdom, at Ancyra (363)
 Venerable Ambrosios.
 Saint Athenodorus.
 Venerable Lazarus the Wonderworker, of Mt. Galesion, near Ephesus (1054)  (see also: July 17, July 18)

Pre-Schism Western saints
 Saint Prosdocimus, first Bishop of Padua in Italy (c. 100)
 Saint Amaranthus, a martyr venerated in Albi in the south of France (3rd century)
 Saint Rufus of Metz, an early Bishop of Metz in France, and Confessor, he was bishop for some twenty-nine years (c. 400)
 Saint Herculanus of Perugia, Martyr-Bishop of Perugia in Italy, beheaded by soldiers of Totila of the Ostrogoths (549) (see also: March 1)
 Saint Congar of Congresbury (Cumgar, Cyngar), founder of monasteries in Badgworth, Congresbury in Somerset, and in Llangennith in Wales (6th century)
 Saint Tremorus of Brittany, infant son of St Triphina, he was the patron saint of Carhaix (6th century)
 Saint Gebetrude (Gertrude), third Abbess of Remiremont Abbey in France (c. 675)
 Saint Raverranus, Bishop of Séez in France (682)
 Saint Gertrude of Remiremont, granddaughter of St Romaricus, and Abbess after her aunt at the convent of Saint-Mont near Remiremont, France (c. 690)
 Saint Florentius of Strasbourg, Bishop of Strasbourg (c. 693)
 Saint Amarand, Abbot of Moissac Abbey in France, became Bishop of Albi (c. 700)
 Saint Willibrord (Clement), Archbishop of Utrecht, Apostle of Frisia (739)
 Saint Blinlivet (Blevileguetus), the twenty-fifth Bishop of Vannes in Brittany (9th century)

Post-Schism Orthodox saints
 Venerable Zosimas, founder of the Annunciation Monastery at Lake Vorbozomsk (1550)

New martyrs and confessors
 New Hieromartyrs (1937):
 Cyril (Smirnov) Metropolitan of Kazan;
 Michael Adamantov, Alexander Ilyinsky, Aleksander Kurmysh, Michael Gusev, Aleksander Krylov, Nikolai Romanovsky, Alexei Molchanov, Paul Borisoglebsky, Basil Krasnov, and Paulinus, Priests; 
 John Moshkov and Benjamin Vladimirsky, Deacons; 
 Martyr Nicholas Filippov; 
 Virgin-martyr Elisabeth Sidorova.
 New Hieromartyrs Sergius, Archbishop of Eletsk; Nicholas Troitsky, priest; and Martyr Gregory Yurenev (1937)
 New Hieromartyr Joseph (Petrovykh), Metropolitan of Petrograd (1937)

Other commemorations
 Translation of the relics (1649) of St. Cyril (1532), founder of Novoezersk Monastery, Novgorod.
 Icon of the Mother of God "Leaping with Joy" (Vzigranie) (1795)
 Ukaz № 362 of November 7/20, 1920, Russian Church Abroad formed.
 Uncovering of the relics (1995) of hieromartyr Constantine Golubev (1918), presbyter (1995)

Icon gallery

Notes

References

Sources
 November 7/November 20. Orthodox Calendar (PRAVOSLAVIE.RU).
 November 20 / November 7. HOLY TRINITY RUSSIAN ORTHODOX CHURCH (A parish of the Patriarchate of Moscow).
 November 7. OCA - The Lives of the Saints.
 The Autonomous Orthodox Metropolia of Western Europe and the Americas (ROCOR). St. Hilarion Calendar of Saints for the year of our Lord 2004. St. Hilarion Press (Austin, TX). p. 83.
 The Seventh Day of the Month of November. Orthodoxy in China.
 November 7. Latin Saints of the Orthodox Patriarchate of Rome.
 The Roman Martyrology. Transl. by the Archbishop of Baltimore. Last Edition, According to the Copy Printed at Rome in 1914. Revised Edition, with the Imprimatur of His Eminence Cardinal Gibbons. Baltimore: John Murphy Company, 1916. pp. 343–344.
 Rev. Richard Stanton. A Menology of England and Wales, or, Brief Memorials of the Ancient British and English Saints Arranged According to the Calendar, Together with the Martyrs of the 16th and 17th Centuries. London: Burns & Oates, 1892. pp. 528–531.

 Greek Sources
 Great Synaxaristes:  7 ΝΟΕΜΒΡΙΟΥ. ΜΕΓΑΣ ΣΥΝΑΞΑΡΙΣΤΗΣ.
  Συναξαριστής. 7 Νοεμβρίου. ECCLESIA.GR. (H ΕΚΚΛΗΣΙΑ ΤΗΣ ΕΛΛΑΔΟΣ).
  07/11/. Ορθόδοξος Συναξαριστής.

 Russian Sources
  20 ноября (7 ноября). Православная Энциклопедия под редакцией Патриарха Московского и всея Руси Кирилла (электронная версия). (Orthodox Encyclopedia - Pravenc.ru).
  7 ноября по старому стилю  /  20 ноября по новому стилю. Русская Православная Церковь - Православный церковный календарь на  год.

November in the Eastern Orthodox calendar